Los Angeles Strikers Football Club is an American women's soccer team, founded in 2011. The team is a member of the United Soccer Leagues W-League, the second tier of women’s soccer in the United States and Canada. The team plays in the Western Conference.
The team plays its home games at Jack Kemp Stadium at Occidental College. The club's colors are red, black and white.

Players

First-team squad 2020-2021

Notable former players

Year-by-year

External links
 LA Strikers FC website
 LA Strikers FC on USL Soccer

References

Women's soccer clubs in California
USL W-League (1995–2015) teams
Strikers
Association football clubs established in 2011
2011 establishments in California